Botanic park can refer specifically to :

Botanic Park, Adelaide,  a park in Adelaide, South Australia
Wavertree Botanic Park and Gardens, a park in Liverpool

Botanic park can also refer generically to any Botanical garden